Joan Barton (born Mary Ann Bock; September 20, 1925 – August 27, 1976 ) was an American actress, best known for starring in Mary Lou (1948).

Early years
Barton was born Mary Ann Bock, the daughter of Mr. and Mrs. William E. Bock. She was from McKeesport, Pennsylvania. Her father was an attorney, and her mother was an actress whose stage name was Sara Snyder. A whistling star who learned that Barton had a talent for throat whistling gave her lessons when she was a teenager, after which she and her parents went to Hollywood.

Career 
In 1946, Barton first appeared in Romance of the West as Melodie and in Lone Star Moonlight later that year. Her first prominent appearance was in Angel and the Badman (1947) with John Wayne and Gail Russell. She also made an appearance in Cigarette Girl (1947). Barton was cast as a lead in musical Mary Lou (1948). She appeared in Strange Gamble (1948).

Television series on which she appeared included Toast of the Town and A Couple of Joes.

From 1951 to 1952, Barton made five uncredited appearances in various films, including Million Dollar Mermaid (1952).

Personal life 
On May 25, 1946, Barton was divorced from James Erwin Thomas.  Barton's marriage to jeweler F. S. Guggenhelmer ended in divorce in 1950. She married businessman Earl Muntz on September 25, 1950, in Las Vegas. They had a daughter Tee Vee (better known as "Teena") in 1953. She was divorced from Muntz on February 16, 1955. She married actor Doye O'Dell in 1955. Muntz contemplated attending their wedding reception, but decided against it at the last minute.She then married Jerry Gray and they remained together until her death in 1976.

Filmography

References 

1925 births
20th-century American actresses
1976 deaths